Lena Bogdanović (born 29 December 1974) is a Serbian actress. She is the daughter of journalist .

Bogdanović graduated from Karlovci Gymnasium and graduated in Acting from the Academy of Arts on Novi Sad in 1997 in the class of Professor Branko Pleša.

From 1997 to 2000 she was a member of the ensemble of the Youth Theatre in Novi Sad, and since 2000, the drama ensemble of the Serbian National Theatre.

She was a participant of the first season of Ples sa zvezdama, the Serbian version of Dancing with the Stars.

Filmography

References

External links

1974 births
Living people
21st-century Serbian actresses
Actors from Novi Sad
Serbian film actresses
Serbian television actresses
Serbian stage actresses